Thomas Jackel (born 6 April 1995) is an Austrian football player. He plays for Wiener Sport-Club.

Club career
He made his Austrian Football First League debut for FC Blau-Weiß Linz on 22 July 2016 in a game against WSG Wattens.

References

External links
 

1995 births
Living people
Austrian footballers
FC Blau-Weiß Linz players
SC Wiener Neustadt players
Wiener Sport-Club players
Austrian Regionalliga players
2. Liga (Austria) players
Association football defenders